Martin Maier (January 20, 1840 – November 9, 1893) was founder and proprietor of Martin Maier Trunk and Bag Company (est. 1865) which specialized in making specialty and sample trunks. His company, which was based in Detroit, Michigan, was one of the largest distributors of luggage and leather goods in the Midwestern United States.

Early life
Martin Maier was born January 20, 1840, in Langensteinbach, Baden, Germany. He learned the saddler's trade, eventually becoming a master saddle maker. At age twenty-one, he migrated to the United States, living with his sister in Monroe, Michigan. Later, he moved to Detroit where he joined the Wolfe Brothers in the trunk and saddlery business. 

Maier moved to St. Louis in 1863 and, when the Civil War broke out, joined the Union Army. He participated in the March to the Sea Campaign from Atlanta and mustered out in 1865. During his time in the war, he fashioned a saddle for General Tecumseh Sherman.

After the war, Maier moved back to Detroit where he married Elizabeth Dorman on May 3, 1866. They had six children.

Trunk and Bag Company
In 1865, Maier established his company at 55 Monroe Avenue in Detroit. He helped coordinate the construction of a business block with two friends, each occupying one-third of the block. The building contained a shoe store, a mortuary, and Maier's trunk and harness shop.

After a fire, Maier moved his store to 102 Woodward Avenue and, later, expanded the business to a four-story block on Twelfth Street, where the trunks were constructed. Maier was prolific in producing patented designs that made his trunks unique. A distinguishing high-quality feature was the issuing of uniquely built oak slat trunks. On much of his trunks, two M's would be stamped in pieces of the metal hardware, particularly his dome-tops.

Death and legacy
On November 9, 1893, Maier died and was buried in Woodmere cemetery. After his death, his wife took over presidency of the trunk company, but rented it to the Scotten Tobacco Company. Later, she would give proprietorship to Frederick Paquette, who had joined the MM Company at the age of  sixteen.

Gallery

See also
Trunk (luggage)
M. M. Secor, a trunk maker in Racine, Wisconsin

References

External links
 Martin Maier ads from 1878 and 1892

1893 deaths
German emigrants to the United States
Businesspeople from Detroit
Union Army soldiers
1840 births
19th-century American businesspeople